{{safesubst:#invoke:RfD|||month = March
|day = 13
|year = 2023
|time = 17:57
|timestamp = 20230313175705

|content=
REDIRECTMid-Bay Bridge

}}